There were 8 triathlon events at the 2010 South American Games.

Medal summary

Medal table

Medalists

References
Medallists

 
Triathlon
South American Games
Qualification tournaments for the 2011 Pan American Games
2010